The 49th International Film Festival Rotterdam, the 2020 installment of the International Film Festival Rotterdam, took place on 22 January–2 February 2020.

The Cloud In Her Room by Zheng Lu Xinyuan won the Tiger Award, the top prize.

Juries

Ammodo Tiger Short
Nathanja van Dijk, filmmaker
Safia Benhaim, filmmaker
Greg de Cuir Jr., film curator and writer

Bright Future
Beatriz Navas, director of ICAA Spain
Zsuzsanna Király, head of development at Komplizen Film
Michel Lipkes, Mexican filmmaker and director of Festival Internacional de Cine Universidad Nacional Autónoma de México

Official selection

Bright Future
The section highlighted work of young and emerging filmmakers, consisted of the Tiger competition, Ammodo Tiger Short competition, Bright Future competition, main, mid-length and short programmes.

Tiger
The following films were selected to compete for the Tiger Award. The line-up was announced on 18 December 2019.

Ammodo Tiger Short
The following films were selected to compete for the Ammodo Tiger Short Competition. The line-up was announced on 4 December 2019.

Bright Future
The programme highlighted first feature films by aspiring filmmakers. 

In competition
The following films were selected to compete for the Bright Future Award. The line-up was announced on 18 December 2019.

Main programme
The programme highlighted cutting-edge work of contemporary filmmakers and a selection of emerging talent.

Voices
The section consisted of:
Big Screen Competition
Voices main programme, which showcased the work of future in arthouse cinema,
Limelight, which showcased international award-winners and festival favourites,
Rotterdämmerung, which showcased the work in hardcore film genres,
Scopitone, which showcased music documentaries, and 
Voices Short.

Big Screen Competition
The following films were selected to compete for the VPRO Big Screen Award. The line-up was announced on 18 December 2019.

Voices Main Programme
The programme highlighted the work of future in arthouse cinema.

Limelight
The programme showcased international award-winners and festival favourites.

Rotterdämmerung
The programme showcased the work in hardcore film genres.

Deep Focus
The section highlighted work of compilations, retrospectives and other formats in cinema. The section consisted of:
Frameworks, which highlighted art films by emerging artists,
Signatures, which showcased new work of established filmmakers,
Regained, which showed restored classic films, films about filmmakers, experimental works and installations,
Beth B: War Is Never Over, which showcased the selection of work about female identity, power and sexuality, curated by Beth B,
Marion Hänsel, à la vie, which showcased the work of Marion Hänsel, and
Deep Focus Short, which paid tribute to Kiluanji Kia Henda and Leonardo Mouramateus.

Signatures
The programme showcased new work of established filmmakers.

Perspectives
The section presented the IFFR's thematic programme and showcased the relevant social and political issues in cinema. The section consisted of:
The Tyger Burns, which presented the contemporary work of old filmmakers,
Synergetic, which showcased the alternative histories of mainstream narrative in cinema,
Ordinary Heroes: Made in Hong Kong, which presented the political, social and economic tensions in Hong Kong,
Sacred Beings, which presented the notion of queer culture, gender fluidity and spiritualities outside the Western perspective, and
Wait and See, which showcased the work about patience.

Awards
The following awards were presented at the 49th edition:

Awards and competition
Tiger Award: The Cloud In Her Room by Zheng Lu Xinyuan
Special Jury Award: Beasts Clawing at Straws by Kim Yong-hoon
Ammodo Tiger Short Award:
Apparition by Ismaïl Bahri
Communicating Vessels by Maïder Fortuné, Annie MacDonell
Sun Dog by Dorian Jespers
Robby Müller Award: Diego García
Big Screen Competition Award: A Perfectly Normal Family by Malou Reymann
NETPAC Award: Nasir by Arun Karthick
Found Footage Award: My Mexican Bretzel by Nuria Giménez Lorang
IFFR Youth Jury Award: Les Misérables by Ladj Ly

Audience Awards
BankGiro Loterij Audience Award: Parasite (B&W Version) by Bong Joon-ho
Voices Short Award: Tabaski by Laurence Attali

Critics Awards
FIPRESCI Award: Only You Alone by Zhou Zhou
KNF Award: Kala azar by Janis Rafailidou

References

External links
 

International Film Festival Rotterdam
Events in Rotterdam
International Film Festival Rotterdam